Patrick Barul (born 2 October 1977 in Orléans) is a French former football defender who played for French team OGC Nice.

Barul was out of contract in June 2009 , but in December 2009 moved to Belgium and joined RFC Tournai.

Honours
Lens
UEFA Intertoto Cup: 2005

References

External links

1977 births
Footballers from Orléans
Living people
French people of Martiniquais descent
French sportspeople of Algerian descent
Association football defenders
French footballers
AS Cannes players
RC Lens players
OGC Nice players
Ligue 1 players
Stade Poitevin FC players